5th National Assembly may refer to:

 5th National Assembly of France
 5th National Assembly of Laos
 5th National Assembly at Nafplion
 5th National Assembly of Namibia
 5th National Assembly of Nigeria
 5th National Assembly of Pakistan
 5th National Assembly of Serbia